WCOM-LP is a community low-power FM radio station, broadcasting from Carrboro, North Carolina. It broadcasts from a radio tower over Mary Scroggs Elementary School soccer field in Chapel Hill, North Carolina. Its studios are located in Carrboro at 300-G E. Main Street, near the Cat's Cradle.  It is the first low-power FM station in the area, and began broadcasting in June 2004.  In November 2004, the station began broadcasting a full lineup of local radio programming, including some Spanish language programming.  It airs a Variety format.

WCOM-LP is the first low-power FM community radio station in the area to be set up under a program established by the Federal Communications Commission in 2000. The station was assigned the WCOM-LP call letters by the Federal Communications Commission on February 5, 2003.

As a low-powered station, WCOM-LP only produces a 100-watt signal; as such, it cannot be heard far from the tower. Its limits are just before the Chapel Hill Public Library and just past Weaver Street Market in Carrboro. During the afternoons, Fayetteville station WRCQ often bleeds over into WCOM-LP's radio space, due to WRCQ's high-power transmitter being fairly close by (about 60 miles).

The station is an affiliate of the syndicated Pink Floyd program "Floydian Slip."

History

WCOM originally planned to set up a broadcasting tower on the roof of the Southern Village branch of Weaver Street Market, then at Culbreth Middle School, but the first location was blocked by the city government and the second location was blocked by the FCC. Ultimately, the antenna was added to the top of a light pole at Scroggs Elementary School.

In June 2004, WCOM-LP "began broadcasting a test signal—a 30-minute loop in English and Spanish explaining the goals of the station. Since the technology was not yet in place to link the studio to the transmitter, that test signal came from a CD cabinet at the base of the transmitter at Scroggs."

See also
List of community radio stations in the United States

References

External links
WCOM-LP official website
WCOM MySpace page
 

COM-LP
COM-LP
Community radio stations in the United States
Radio stations established in 2004
Mass media in Chapel Hill-Carrboro, North Carolina